McConica is a surname. Notable people with the surname include:

Jim McConica (born 1950), American swimmer
Thomas Henry McConica (1855–1933), American-born Canadian politician